Rowing is one of the sports at the quadrennial Commonwealth Games competition. It has been a Commonwealth Games sport since 1930. It was held at every edition from 1938 to 1962, but was not held again until 1986, and has not been part of the Games program since. It is an optional sport and may, or may not, be included in the sporting programme of future editions of the Games.

A separate event, the Commonwealth Rowing Championships, has been held in Commonwealth Games years since 2002. Commonwealth Rowing Regatta events were also held in 1994 and 1999.

Editions

All-time medal table

References

External links
Commonwealth Games sport index

 
Sports at the Commonwealth Games
Commonwealth Games